In mathematics in general, a characterization theorem says that a particular object – a function, a space, etc. – is the only one that possesses properties specified in the theorem. A characterization of a probability distribution accordingly states that it is the only probability distribution that satisfies specified conditions. More precisely, the model of characterization of
On the probability space we define the space  of random variables with values in measurable metric space  and the space  of random variables with values in measurable metric space .
The description of the properties of the random variables  and of their images  is equivalent to the indication of the set  from which    must be taken and of the set  into which its image must fall. So, the set which interests us appears therefore in the following form:

This is the general model of characterization of probability distribution. Some examples of characterization theorems:

 The assumption that two linear (or non-linear) statistics are identically distributed (or independent, or have a constancy regression and so on) can be used to characterize various populations. In this case 
,
In this case
,

 All probability distributions on the half-line  that are memoryless are exponential distributions. "Memoryless" means that if  is a random variable with such a distribution, then for any numbers  ,
 .

Verification of conditions of characterization theorems in practice is possible only with some error , i.e., only to a certain degree of accuracy. Such a situation is observed, for instance, in the cases where a sample of finite size is considered. That is why there arises the following natural question. Suppose that the conditions of the characterization theorem are fulfilled not exactly but only approximately. May we assert that the conclusion of the theorem is also fulfilled approximately? The theorems in which the problems of this kind are considered are called stability characterizations of probability distributions.

See also 

 Characterization (mathematics)

References 

 
Probability theorems
Theorems in statistics